Hypolycaena obscura is a butterfly in the family Lycaenidae. It is found in Sudan, Uganda, Kenya and western Tanzania.

References

Butterflies described in 1947
Hypolycaenini